is a railway station on the Kabe Line in Asakita-ku, Hiroshima, Hiroshima Prefecture, Japan. It is operated by the West Japan Railway Company (JR West). From December 1, 2003 to March 4, 2017, it was the terminal station of the Kabe Line.

Station layout

Kabe Station has two side platforms handling two tracks. Before the extension to Aki-Kameyama Station, the station handled three tracks. Tracks one and two were bay platforms, and handled trains heading towards Hiroshima Station. The third track was bidirectional, and also led towards the abandoned portion of the Kabe line.

Platforms

Toilet facilities

Prior to 2006, a unisex restroom was located outside the station before passing through the ticket gates. While the station is within the city of Hiroshima, this restroom featured a pit-style toilet which had to be pumped regularly in order to remove the accumulated waste. The station had developed somewhat of a bad reputation because of this due to the lingering odor. This issue was resolved in 2006 with the replacement of gender-specific restrooms featuring standard flush toilets connected to the city's sewer system.

History

1911-07-13: Kobe Station opens
1919-03-11: The station becomes part of Kabe Railroad
1926-05-01: Kabe Railroad merges with Hiroshima Denki and the station ownership is transferred with the merger
1928-11-09: Service from Furuichibashi Station is suspended while track electrification takes place, buses handles service during this time
1929-12-02: Service begins again after the completion of the electrification work
1931-07-01: The station becomes part of Kōhama Railway
1935-12-01: The station is renamed Kōhama Kabe Station
1936-09-01: The station is renamed Kabe Station when it is nationalized
1936-10-13: The line between Aki-Imuro Station and Kabe Station is opened, making Kabe Station an intermediate station
1987-04-01: Japanese National Railways is privatized, and Kabe Station becomes a JR West station
2003-12-01: Service on the 46.2 km non-electrified rail line segment from Kabe Station to Sandankyō Station is suspended, making Kabe Station the terminal station of the Kabe Line
2017-03-04: Kabe Station ceases to be the terminus of the Kabe Line after a 1.6 km electrified extension to  opens, platform three closes

Surrounding area
 National Route 54
Hiroshima Municipal Kabe Minami Elementary School
Hiroshima Municipal Kabe High School
Hiroshima Bunkyo Women's University
Kabe Station Entrance Bus Station
Kabe Driving School
Kabe Public Employment Office
Doi Clinic
Ōta River
JR West Geibi Line Shimofukawa Station is located 1.5 km southwest

See also
 List of railway stations in Japan

References

External links

  

Kabe Line
Hiroshima City Network
Stations of West Japan Railway Company in Hiroshima city
Railway stations in Japan opened in 1911